Reginald Henry Lewis (1894–1973), was an English painter and portrait artist.

Reginald Lewis trained at the Royal Academy and for 7 years was apprenticed to the architect and designer, Sir Frank Brangwyn. He also worked as assistant to Frank Owen Salisbury.

References

External links
 

20th-century English painters
English male painters
English portrait painters
1894 births
1973 deaths
20th-century English male artists